Raageshwari Loomba is an Indian singer, actress, television personality, mindfulness speaker.

Biography
Raageshwari attended the Auxilium Convent High School.

As a teenager, Raageshwari signed her first film as an actor, Zid (released in 1994).

Raageshwari signed a deal with Coca-Cola to do a series of concerts all over India.

In 2000, Raageshwari and her father collaborated on another album, Y2K Saal Do Hazaar. Raageshwari was suffering from malaria, while shooting for the video "Ikki chikki chikita." The album was released with a concert on the eve of the year 2000. Just a week after the concert, Raageshwari was diagnosed with Bell's palsy, which left her with a paralysed left side of the face and a slur in her voice. Over the next year, she rehabilitated herself with help of physiotherapy, electrical stimulation and yoga. She did television shows such as Ek do teen and Baar baar dekho on MTV, Kuch Kehti Hai Yeh Dhun on Sony, Quest for BBC and One on One With Raageshwari on TEN Sports.

Raageshwari  married London based human rights  lawyer, Sudhanshu Swaroop KC on January 27, 2014, in Mumbai. She gave birth to a baby girl on February 11, 2016, in London.

Filmography

Hindi films
Raageshwari has acted in following Hindi-language films:
 Mumbai Se Aaya Mera Dost (2003), Star TV Reporter Priya Narayan
 Tum Jiyo Hazaron Saal (2002), Sunanda Kohli
 Dil Kitna Nadan Hai (1997)
 Main Khiladi Tu Anari (1994), Shivangi
 Zid (1994 film), a 1994 Bollywood film
  Dil Aa Gaya (1994)
 Aankhen (1993), Priya Mohan

Television
Host
Raageshwari has hosted following shows on television:
 Baar Baar Dekho Tum, MTV
 MTV Ek Do Teen, MTV
 BPL Oye, Channel [V]
 Show on Indian Mythologies on BBC Quest, BBC
 Kuch Kehti HaiYe Dhun, musical game show on Sony
 Mini Super Stars, kids' show for Kerry Packer
 One on One with Rags, TEN Sports
 Queen's Baton Relay launch (September 2005)
 Sab Gol Maal Hai, SAB TV
 Zip Zap Zoom, a music and entertainment show for kids by ARY Digital (Pakistan)
 Heart Throbs: Hrithik Roshan World Tour Live (2002) Raageshwari was the hostess and one of the performers on the concerts.
 In October 2011 she appeared as a contestant in Indian version of reality show Big Brother, Big Boss (season 5).
 Jeene Ki Aasha NDTV.

As a contestant

Theatre
Raageshwari debuted as a lead in the musical comedy The Graduate alongside Zeenat Aman.

Discography
Playback singing in Hindi film:
 One 2 Ka 4Albums
 Duniya (March 1997)
 Pyaar Ka Rang (July 1998)
 Sach Ka Saath (January 1998)
 Y2K- saal do hazaar (December 1999)
 Sagari Rayn (December 2006)
 Lifting the Veil – Ismaili Ginans(to be released)

DuniyaDuniya is a pop album released in March 1997. Tracks include:
 Duniya (music video)
 Chaahat Raftaar Kudi E' Punjab Di Medley Poore Karen Khwaab Rafta-Rafta Oye Saathi Kal Ki Na Fiqar Oye Shaava (music video)

Sach Ka SaathSach Ka Saath is a Patriotic Folk Music album by National Award-winning Music director/Singer 'Trilok Singh Loomba'. The album released in January 1998. The album featured 'Raageshwari' as a guest singer for the track 'Sach Ka Saath' The other tracks include:
 Sach Ka Saath (music video)
 Bharat Banaayen Milkar Yeh Desh Hamaara Maya Jaal Pyaari Duniya Anushaasan Zindagi Kya Se Kya Hui Aatanki AadamPyaar Ka RangPyaar Ke Rang is a pop album released in July 1998. Tracks include:
 Pyaar Ka Rang (music video)
 Jawanion Ke Din Baby Go For It Saat Samundar Par Haakan Party Pyaar Ka Khel (music video)
 Mere Mehboob (music video)

Y2K: Saal Do HazaarY2K: Saal Do Hazaar is a pop album released in December 1999. Tracks include:
 Y2K Saal Do Hazaar (music video)
 Y2K Dance Mix (music video)
 Mahiya Pehachaan Haakan (remix)
 Zakham Dil Sheesha Ikki Chikki Chikita (music video)

Sagari RaynSagari Rayn is a world music album released in December 2006. Tracks include:
 Sagari Rayn (music video)
 Kadmon Ke Nishan Mast Qalandar Jugni Maavan Te Dhiyan Dandiya Medley Holidays Hum Josh Balle Balle''

References

External links
 
 Official website
 

Living people
20th-century Indian actresses
Female models from Mumbai
Indian pop singers
Indian women playback singers
Indian women pop singers
Indian film actresses
Indian women television presenters
Indian television presenters
Actresses from Mumbai
Indian VJs (media personalities)
Punjabi people
21st-century Indian actresses
21st-century Indian women singers
21st-century Indian singers
Women musicians from Maharashtra
Singers from Mumbai
Bigg Boss (Hindi TV series) contestants
1977 births